Mohmad Akhmadov (Russian: Мохмад Исаевич Ахмадов; born 17 April 1972) is a Russian politician serving as a senator from the Parliament of the Chechen Republic since 4 October 2021.

Mohmad Akhmadov is under personal sanctions introduced by the European Union, the United Kingdom, the USA, Canada, Switzerland, Australia, Ukraine, New Zealand, for ratifying the decisions of the "Treaty of Friendship, Cooperation and Mutual Assistance between the Russian Federation and the Donetsk People's Republic and between the Russian Federation and the Luhansk People's Republic" and providing political and economic support for Russia's annexation of Ukrainian territories.

Biography

Mohmad Akhmadov was born on 17 April 1972 in Shali, Chechen Republic. In 1995, he graduated from the Chechen State Pedagogical Institute. From 1991 to 1992, he worked as an accountant of the Sintem-U cooperative. From September 1992 to August 1993, he was a tax inspector in Chechen Republic. From April 2000 to 2007, he was the senior lecturer at the Department of Economics and Production Management at Chechen State University. On 19 November 2008, he was appointed Minister of Labor, Employment, and Social Development of the Chechen Republic. From 2016 to 2019, he was the deputy of the Parliament of the Chechen Republic. On 14 November 2019, he was appointed the senator from the Parliament of the Chechen Republic. On 4 October 2021, he was re-appointed to this position.

References

Living people
1972 births
United Russia politicians
21st-century Russian politicians
Members of the Federation Council of Russia (after 2000)
People from Shalinsky District, Chechen Republic